The Minister of Housing is a minister in the government of New Zealand with responsibility for the government's house-building programme. The position was established in 1938 as Minister in charge of Housing, and has most commonly been known as Minister of Housing. Other iterations have included the Minister of Building and Housing, the Minister of Social Housing, and the Minister of Housing and Urban Development.

The present Minister is Megan Woods, a member of the Labour Party, who has held the position since 2019. Woods was confirmed as the Minister for Labour's second term of Government in 2020.

History
The First Labour Government created the position of Minister in charge of Housing in 1938, to oversee the government's state housing agenda. Responsibility for housing was part of the Works portfolio for some years until the restoration of the Housing portfolio by the Second National Government in 1949.

Until the 1970s, the Housing portfolio was often held in conjunction with responsibility for the State Advances Corporation; the Corporation was dissolved and much of its responsibility transferred to the new Housing Corporation of New Zealand in 1974. In the 1990s, under the significant redistribution of responsibility that occurred following Jenny Shipley's appointment as Prime Minister, responsibility for housing issues was divided between three ministers: the Minister for Social Services, Work and Income; the Minister responsible for the Housing Corporation of New Zealand; and the Minister responsible for Housing New Zealand. The Housing Corporation and Housing New Zealand merged into a single entity, Housing New Zealand Corporation, on 6 March 2002.

A separate Minister for Building Issues (later Minister for Building and Construction) was established by the Fourth Labour Government as the Ministry of Housing was expanded to become the Department of Building and Housing. Under the Fifth National Government, the government's focus shifted from providing state houses to providing "social houses," which meant that income-related rent subsidies could be paid to non-governmental community housing providers. While this Government had once combined social housing and building regulation responsibility in a combined "Building and Housing" portfolio, this was disestablished in December 2016 and divided between the Minister for Social Housing and the Minister for Building and Construction.

Phil Twyford was appointed as Housing Minister. On 1 October 2018, Housing Minister Twyford launched a new government department called the Ministry of Housing and Urban Development to advise the Government on housing and urban development issues. During a 2019 cabinet reshuffle the housing and urban development portfolio was split into three positions; appointing Megan Woods as Minister of Housing, Kris Faafoi as Associate Minister of Housing (for rentals), and  Twyford as Minister of Urban Development. After the  Woods was confirmed as Minister of Housing while the urban development portfolio was abolished completely. In early 2021, the Labour government was criticised by the opposition government and some housing industry stakeholders, who said the government has failed to address New Zealand's out-of-control house prices.

List of Ministers
Key

Notes
a.  The Ministers for Building and Housing and Social Housing existed simultaneously during the period 8 October 2014 – 20 December 2016.

References

Social Housing
Public housing
Housing in New Zealand
Welfare in New Zealand